Tarader Shesh Tarpon is a Bengali web series released on 17th September 2020 on the Bengali OTT platform hoichoi. Directed by Aritra Mukherjee and produced by Windows production the series is a documentary one where the audience memorizes the celebrated personalities who are not with us. They have touched our hearts through their work but unfortunately, we lost them in recent times.

Premise 
Tarpon is a Bengali tradition, to offer prayers to our forefathers. This show is an attempt to pay tribute to the personalities who have moved us in some way through their achievements in their respective field of expertise. 
Goutam Bhattacharya will host the show as the main anchor. Many celebrities (Prosenjit Chatterjee, Jisshu Sengupta, Sourav Ganguly, Srijit Mukherjee) and many others from different fields will also share their thoughts about the lost stars.

Cast 
Gautam Bhattacharya
Sourav Ganguly
Prosenjit Chatterjee
Jisshu Sengupta
Srijit Mukherjee
Saswata Chatterjee
Soumitra Chattopadhyay

Episodes

Seasons
SEASON 1 (2020)

On 17th September 2020, hoichoi released the first four episodes of the web series. Music directed by Indraadip Dasgupta

SEASON 2 (2021)

In 2021, the second season of the series was released. Music directed by Amit-Ishaan

References

External links

Indian web series
2017 web series debuts
Bengali-language web series
Hoichoi original programming